Morley Safer (November 8, 1931 – May 19, 2016) was a Canadian-American broadcast journalist,  reporter, and correspondent for CBS News. He was best known for his long tenure on the news magazine 60 Minutes, whose cast he joined in 1970 after its second year on television. He was the longest-serving reporter on 60 Minutes, the most watched and most profitable program in television history.

During his 60-year career as a broadcast journalist, Safer received numerous awards, including twelve Emmys, a Lifetime Achievement Emmy from the National Academy of Television Arts and Sciences, three Overseas Press Awards,  three Peabody Awards, two Alfred I. duPont-Columbia University Awards,  and the Paul White Award from the Radio-Television News Directors Association. In 2009, Safer donated his papers to the Dolph Briscoe Center for American History at the University of Texas at Austin.

Jeff Fager, executive producer of 60 Minutes, said "Morley has had a brilliant career as a reporter and as one of the most significant figures in CBS News history, on our broadcast and in many of our lives. Morley's curiosity, his sense of adventure and his superb writing, all made for exceptional work done by a remarkable man." He died a week after announcing his retirement from 60 Minutes.

Early life
Safer was born to an Austrian Jewish family in Toronto, Ontario, the son of Anna (née Cohn) and Max Safer, an upholsterer. He had an older brother, Leon Safer, and an older sister, Esther Safer. After reading works by Ernest Hemingway, he had decided in his youth that, like Hemingway, he wanted to be a foreign correspondent. He attended Harbord Collegiate Institute and Bloor Collegiate Institute in Toronto, Ontario, and briefly attended the University of Western Ontario before he dropped out to become a newspaper reporter. He said, "I was a reporter on the street at 19 and never went to college."

Career
Safer began his journalism career as a reporter for various newspapers in Ontario (Woodstock Sentinel-Review, London Free Press, and Toronto Telegram) and England in 1955 (Reuters and Oxford Mail). Later, he joined the Canadian Broadcasting Corporation (CBC) as a correspondent and producer.

International news and war correspondent
One of his first jobs with CBC was to produce CBC News Magazine in 1956, where his first on-screen appearance as a journalist was covering the Suez Crisis in Egypt. Still with the CBC, in 1961 he worked from London where he was assigned to cover major stories in Europe, North Africa and the Middle East, including the Algerian War of independence from France. Also in 1961, he was the only Western correspondent in East Berlin at the time the Communists began building the Berlin Wall.

In 1964, CBS hired Safer as a London-based correspondent. He worked from the same desk that had once been used by Edward R. Murrow. The following year, in 1965, he became the first full-time staff reporter of the CBS News bureau in Saigon to cover the growing military conflict in Vietnam. By 1967 he was made the CBS bureau chief in London where his news stories covered numerous global conflicts, including the Nigerian Civil War,
the Arab-Israeli war of 1967, and the Warsaw Pact invasion of Czechoslovakia in 1968. With the help of some clandestine skills, Safer and his news team became the first United States-based journalists to report from inside Communist China, broadcast in 1967 as a Special CBS News Report, "Morley Safer's Red China Diary".

Safer's August 1965 Vietnam report, "The Burning of Cam Ne," was notable and controversial because he had accompanied a company of Marines to the village for what was described as a "search and destroy" mission. When the Marines arrived, they were fired on by snipers. They told the inhabitants to evacuate the village, which the Marines then burned down. Safer's report was among the earliest to paint a bleak picture of the Vietnam War, showing apparently innocent civilians as victims. However, many American military and political leaders judged the story to be harmful to United States interests and criticized CBS News for showing it. United States President Lyndon Johnson reacted to this report angrily, calling CBS's president and accusing Safer and his colleagues of having undermined America's role there.

Some ex-Marines who saw Safer's story on television during the war shared President Johnson's opinion. They claim that Safer never had time to be properly briefed on the operation, and was therefore not aware that four Marines had already been killed there and twenty-seven wounded. Ex-Marine Larry Engelmann, author of a story on the Vietnam War, claimed Safer's story was "highly sensational". Justifying collective punishment, he alleged: "The fact is that this village had been a pretty tough village and these people had been warned repeatedly that the village would be torched if they continued to shoot at Marines... But there was none of that in Morley Safer's story."

In the PBS series, Reporting America At War, Safer himself said, "...the denials themselves were absurd. [Officials claimed] I had gone on a practice operation in a model village — a village the Marines had built to train guys how to move into a village. Or the whole thing was a kind of "Potemkin" story that I had concocted. There are still people who believe that."

After the incident was broadcast, Marines were forbidden from burning any more villages.

While reporting another story from Vietnam, Safer and two CBS cameramen were shot down in a helicopter by Vietcong ground fire, although they all escaped serious injury. Brig. Gen. Joe Stringham, who commanded a Green Beret unit with Safer reporting, commented that Safer "was all business and he reported what he saw. ...We looked at eternity right in the face a couple of times...and he was as cool as a hog on ice."

Safer received an Emmy Award in 1971 for his investigation and reporting of the Gulf of Tonkin incident. Although the war reports were consistently broadcast on television, Safer said it was the country's inability to clearly explain to the public why they were at war that became the main source of people's "disillusionment":

 
During his career as a war correspondent, Safer covered over nine wars. He authored the bestselling book, Flashbacks: On Returning to Vietnam. It describes his 1989 return to Vietnam and features his interviews with known and less-well-known Vietnamese people, most of them veterans of the war. His trip was the basis of a 60 Minutes show in 1989, which Safer said got a reaction of annoyance from some veterans, and a positive reaction from others.

60 Minutes reporter

In 1970, CBS producer Don Hewitt asked Safer to replace Harry Reasoner on 60 Minutes, as Reasoner had just left to anchor the ABC Evening News. Hewitt had created 60 Minutes, and he was, according to Diane Sawyer, the program's "guiding, self-renewing, revitalizing genius." Safer, who had been covering the funeral of Charles de Gaulle in Paris, accepted the new position and joined 60 Minutes.

The show had by then aired for only two seasons, and Safer, who had until that time reported and traveled alone, recalled that he accepted the new position on condition that if the show failed, he would be given his old job back: "I was the new kid, with a lot of pressure, because we were trying something new. We were utterly unheard of. I was utterly a stranger to working in a head office." Until that new position, says Safer, "my staff, when I was abroad, consisted of only me."

Over the subsequent decades, along with Safer, the other veteran reporters for the program included Dan Rather, Mike Wallace, Walter Cronkite, Ed Bradley, Charles Kuralt, Diane Sawyer and Bob Simon. Reasoner had also returned to do some 60 Minutes segments before he retired. 60 Minutes eventually became the most-watched and most profitable program in television history.

Safer's style of interviewing was consistently done in a friendly and gentlemanly manner, which gave him the ability to ask penetrating questions that average viewers might ask. He was persistent in the pursuit of facts needed to support the accuracy of his stories. While he often added his own point of view to reports, Safer always maintained high professional standards, a style that helped establish the tone of 60 Minutes shows. He typed stories on his manual typewriter even after computers were in common use. To investigate and write his 60 Minutes stories, Safer often traveled as much as 200,000 miles a year.

Hewitt credited Safer with having a "great eye for stories", whether they were sympathetic or tough. He could write about offbeat subjects to give the show flavor, such as a piece he did in Finland about the Finns' obsession with the tango dance. Or he could write a hardcore report, such as one which helped save the life of a black man imprisoned in Texas. For that 1983 story, about Lenell Geter, a 25-year-old black aerospace engineer serving a life sentence for robbery, Safer sifted through details of the case and found factual inconsistencies and implied racial biases. After Safer's report was broadcast, Geter was released in 1984.

In addition to the Emmy he was awarded for the Gulf of Tonkin report, he also won Emmys for other 60 Minutes stories: "Pops" (1979); "Teddy Kollek's Jerusalem" (1979);  "Air Force Surgeon" (Investigative Journalism, 1982); and "It Didn't Have to Happen" (Correspondent, 1982). In 1994 he hosted a CBS News Special, One for the Road: A Conversation with Charles Kuralt and Morley Safer, which marked Kuralt's retirement from CBS.

Safer's remarks at the time of President Ronald Reagan's death brought charges of liberal bias. Safer said about Reagan: "I don't think history has any reason to be kind to him."

He retired after 46 years with CBS, a week before his death; by then Safer had set the record for the show's longest-serving correspondent. A few days after he retired, CBS broadcast an hour-long special, Morley Safer: A Reporter's Life.

During his 60-year career as a broadcast journalist, Safer received numerous awards, including twelve Emmys, and a Lifetime Achievement Emmy from the National Academy of Television Arts and Sciences in 1966 when he was only 35; this was remarkable because the award is usually given after a lifetime of work. Including his three Overseas Press Awards, three Peabody Awards, two Alfred I. duPont-Columbia University Awards, and the Paul White Award from the Radio-Television News Directors Association, Safer won every major award given in broadcast journalism.

Safer narrated several documentaries, including Exodus 1947 (1997), American Experience (1997), American Masters (1996), Bicentennial Minutes (1975), and Saigon (1957).

The Morley Safer Award for Outstanding Reporting

In January 2019, the Morley Safer Award was created and sent out its inaugural call for entries. A program of The University of Texas at Austin's Briscoe Center for American History, where Safer's archival papers are preserved, the Safer Award seeks to recognize a story or series of stories of creativity, vision and integrity. The award is presented at a luncheon in Manhattan each fall.

Personal life
He married Jane Fearer, an anthropology student, in 1968 in London, where he was serving as bureau chief for CBS News. Their daughter, Sarah Alice Anne Safer, is a 1992 graduate of Brown University and a freelance journalist.

Safer maintained dual Canadian/American citizenship.

Death
Safer died at his New York home from pneumonia on May 19, 2016, just eight days after announcing his retirement from 60 Minutes following 46 seasons with the show. Four days prior to his death, CBS aired a special 60 Minutes episode covering Safer's 61-year journalism career. Safer was laid to rest at Roselawn Avenue Cemetery in Toronto.

Awards 

12-time Emmy Award winner
3-time Overseas Press Award winner
3-time George Foster Peabody Award winner
2-time Alfred I. duPont–Columbia University Award winner
Winner of the Paul White Award from the Radio-Television News Directors Association (1966)
Recipient of a Lifetime Achievement Emmy from the National Academy of Television Arts and Sciences (2003)
Received the 2003 George Polk Memorial Career Achievement Award from Long Island University
Received the Robert F. Kennedy Journalism Awards' first prize for domestic television for his insightful report about a controversial school, "School for the Homeless"
Named a Chevalier dans l'Ordre des Arts et des Lettres by the French government in 1995
Received Brown University's Welles Hangen Award for Superior Achievement in Journalism (1993)
Recipient of The International Center in New York's Award of Excellence

See also
Betty Ford's August 1975 60 Minutes interview

References

External links 

American broadcast news analysts
American television reporters and correspondents
American war correspondents
1931 births
2016 deaths
CBS News people
60 Minutes correspondents
Emmy Award winners
Peabody Award winners
Chevaliers of the Ordre des Arts et des Lettres
Canadian television reporters and correspondents
Canadian expatriate journalists in the United States
Canadian war correspondents
War correspondents of the Nigerian Civil War
War correspondents of the Vietnam War
Deaths from pneumonia in New York City
Canadian people of Austrian-Jewish descent
Journalists from Toronto
Writers from Toronto
University of Western Ontario alumni
20th-century American journalists
American male journalists
21st-century American journalists
Jewish Canadian journalists